Lycée Paul Valéry (LPV) is a French international school in Meknès, Morocco. It serves levels maternelle (preschool) through lycée (senior high school). It is named after the French poet Paul Valéry.

It was originally established as the École française de Meknès in 1914. Its current building opened in a former barracks in 1962, and the school received its current name that year.

References

External links
  Lycée Paul Valéry

French international schools in Morocco
Meknes
Educational institutions established in 1914
1914 establishments in Morocco
20th-century architecture in Morocco